Jordan Aviation (PSC) is an airline based in Amman, Jordan. It operates worldwide charter  flights, provides wet lease services to major airlines seeking additional capacity and is also an important provider of air transportation for UN peacekeeping forces. Its main base is Queen Alia International Airport (AMM/OJAI), Amman from where it operates its fleet of Wide Body and Narrow Body aircraft. In addition it has its own MRO which forms part of is Operations & Technical Centre opened in October 2010.

History
The airline was established as a company in 1998 and gained its Air Operators Certificate in 2000 commencing operations in October of that year. The airline started operations with a Boeing 737-400. It launched services from Amman as the first privately owned charter airline in Jordan. Jordan Aviation operates a varied route network with a worldwide AOC. UN Peacekeepers are carried extensively on the various aircraft in the Fleet and the company also is involved in  "wet-leasing" aircraft to air carriers who need extra capacity. Holiday Charter Flights are also operated from its bases in Amman. 

Jordan Aviation is owned by Mohamed Al-Khashman (President & Chief Executive Officer) and Hazem Alrasekh, and has over 900 employees (as at June 2012). The company has grown considerably, as the fleet listing below shows. An Airbus A330-200 joined the fleet in March 2012 and this will be followed with additional aircraft planned to enter service in the next quarter – an Airbus A320-200 and a Boeing 737-300. Expansion into other market segments is in process.

Following the open sky territory agreement and relaxation of civil aviation regulation in Aqaba, Jordan. The airline shifted its operation to the King Hussein International Airport, the firm launched its inaugural flight from there in 2004. Between 2005 and 2007, Jordan Aviation operated scheduled charter flights from King Hussein International Airport to regional destinations including Kuwait City, Doha, Alexandria, Dubai, Cairo and Manama. Jordan Aviation was also recognized by King Abdullah II as one of the top ten initiatives benefiting the economy of Aqaba.

Destinations
As of February 2021, Jordan Aviation operates to the following destinations:

Egypt
Cairo - Cairo International Airport

Iraq
Baghdad - Baghdad International Airport

Jordan
Amman - Queen Alia International Airport base

Saudi Arabia
Jeddah - King Abdulaziz International Airport 

Kuwait
 Kuwait City - Kuwait International Airport 

Oman
 Muscat - Muscat International Airport 

United Arab Emirates
 Dubai - Dubai International Airport

Fleet

The Jordan Aviation fleet consists of the following aircraft as of August 2019:

References

External links

Official website

Airlines of Jordan
Arab Air Carriers Organization members
Airlines established in 2000
Companies based in Amman
Jordanian companies established in 2000